

National teams

England women's national football team

Results and fixtures

Friendlies

2019 FIFA Women's World Cup

Group D

Knockout stage

2020 SheBelieves Cup

UEFA competition

UEFA Women's Champions League

Knockout phase

Round of 32

Notes

Round of 16

Quarter-finals

Domestic competition

League structure

FA Women's Super League

FA Women's Championship

FA Women's National League

Northern Division

Southern Division

Division One North

Division One Midlands

Division One South East

Division One South West

Cup competitions

FA Women's Cup

Final

The final was played at Wembley Stadium on Saturday 1 November 2020.

FA Women's League Cup

Final

Academy/reserve leagues
Both the FA Women's Super League and the FA Women's National League ran additional leagues alongside their main divisions for academy and reserve teams. The WSL organised the FA WSL Academy league, which is contested by academy teams from eleven of the twelve top-flight clubs. The only team not to enter an academy side in the competition is Tottenham Hotspur, whose place in the league was filled by Ipswich Town's under-21s.

The WNL have six regional divisions for reserve and development teams from clubs in the FA Women's National League and FA Women's Championship. They are Northern divisions 1 and 2, Midland divisions 1 and 2, the South East division and the South West division.

These divisions are all independent of the main women's football pyramid system and there is no promotion or relegation to other leagues.

References

See also
2019–20 in English football

 
 
2019 sport-related lists